Tinaktak is a Chamorro dish from Guam and is made from finely chopped pieces of meat. The name comes from the Chamorro word taktak, an onomatopoeia from the sound of meat being chopped/tenderized. Traditionally, it is from chopped meat, but oftentimes ground meat is used. It is oftentimes cooked with beef in coconut milk, tomatoes, green beans and served with rice. Although local vegetables are often used, other vegetables can be substituted. Meatless grounds can be used to make the dish vegan. During Lent, seafood can be used as the protein. Tinaktak is often cooked in many households in Guam but is also served at parties and restaurants.

References

Chamorro cuisine